Frank James Cruickshank (20 November 1931 – 20 January 2015) was a Scottish former professional footballer who played as a full back.

References

Scottish footballers
Association football defenders
Burnley F.C. players
Nuneaton Borough F.C. players
Notts County F.C. players
Cheltenham Town F.C. players
Cambridge City F.C. players
English Football League players
1931 births
2015 deaths
People from Polmont
Footballers from Falkirk (council area)
Southern Football League players